Philip Layton Barlow (born 1950) is a Harvard-trained scholar who specializes in American religious history, religious geography, and Mormonism. In 2019, Barlow was appointed associate director of the Neal A. Maxwell Institute for Religious Scholarship (Maxwell Institute). Barlow was the first full-time professor of Mormon studies at a secular university as the inaugural Leonard J. Arrington Chair of Mormon History and Culture at Utah State University (USU), from 2007 to 2018.

Biography

Barlow was raised in Bountiful, Utah. He is a member of the Church of Jesus Christ of Latter-day Saints (LDS Church). In 1975, he graduated with a bachelor's degree in history from Weber State College. In 1980 and 1988, respectively, he received a master's degree in theological studies and a doctorate of theology (Th.D.) from the Harvard Divinity School. While in the Boston area, Barlow taught at the LDS Church's local Institute of Religion. He also served as a counselor in a bishopric to Mitt Romney.

In 2017, Barlow held the first fellowship at the Maxwell Institute at Brigham Young University.

The Arrington Chair of Mormon History and Culture

The establishment in 2007 of the Arrington Chair at USU was one prominent symbol of a new era for the study of the Mormon faith in secular higher education. It was part of the new religious studies program at the university, the first program in Utah enabling students to major in religion. Since the establishment of the Arrington Chair, Richard Bushman was inaugurated as the Howard W. Hunter Chair of Mormon Studies at Claremont Graduate University of Religion, which was followed by the 2012 creation of the Richard Lyman Bushman chair of Mormon Studies at University of Virginia.

Publications
As Author: 

New Historical Atlas of Religion in America.  Oxford University Press, 2001.  (Co-authored with Edwin Scott Gaustad)
Mormons and the Bible: The Place of the Latter-day Saints in American Religion.  Oxford University Press, 1991.

As Editor:

Religion and Public Life in the Midwest: America’s Common Denominator?  Alta Mira Press, 2004.  (co-edited with Mark Silk)
A Thoughtful Faith: Essays on Belief by Mormon Scholars.  Canon Press, 1986.
The Oxford Handbook of Mormonism.  Oxford University Press, 2015, .  (co-edited with Terryl L. Givens)

Notes

References
  "Past MHA Presidents". Mormon History Association.
 Utah State University Faculty Website
  12 Questions for Philip Barlow.  Times and Seasons Blog.
  Deseret News Article.

External links
 
 Barlow's faculty website at Utah State University
 Barlow's curriculum vitae

1950 births
American Latter Day Saint writers
American religion academics
Church Educational System instructors
Hanover College
Harvard Divinity School alumni
Historians of the Latter Day Saint movement
Living people
Mormon studies scholars
People from Bountiful, Utah
Religious studies scholars
Utah State University faculty
Weber State University alumni
American historians of religion
American male non-fiction writers
Maxwell Institute people
Latter Day Saints from Utah
Latter Day Saints from Massachusetts
Latter Day Saints from Indiana
Latter Day Saint biblical scholars